Low Gap and Lowgap may refer to:

Low Gap, Kentucky, an unincorporated community in Johnson County
Lowgap, North Carolina, an unincorporated community in Surry County
Low Gap, West Virginia, an unincorporated community in Boone County